Augusto Fraga (9 October 1910 – 6 January 2000), born in Lisbon, was a Portuguese film director.

During the 1930s, Fraga was a journalist, a critic and a cinematographic illustrator. He was also director of the magazine Cinéfilo from 1938-1939 and collaborated in the creation of Animatograph and World Graphic. In the following decade, he was editor of The Century until it closed and also of the supplement Success from the Lisbon Agenda.

Fraga was a particularly hostile critic towards Nazi Germany's attempts at propaganda towards neutral Italy during World War II. This particularly focused on criticism of editing film that had been taken in a non-believable fashion, to the point that even a casual film-goer would be able to identify the changes.

Between 1948-1949 Fraga made short films in Spain as well as being a screenwriter. He would shift these professions to the radio in the 1950s. His two most successful films are [[O Tarzan do 5o Esquerdo]] and Sangue Toureiro.

Filmography
 Traição Inverosímil - 1970
 As Ilhas do Meio do Mundo (Documentary) - 1966
 A Voz do Sangue - 1965
 Vinte E Nove Irmãos - 1964
 ABC a Preto E Branco (Short Documentary) - 1964
 Uma Hora de Amor - 1962
 Um Dia de Vida - 1961
 Angola (Documentary) - 1961
 Raça - 1961
 Terra Ardente (Documentary) - 1960
 Terra Mãe (Documentary) - 1960
 O Passarinho da Ribeira - 1958
 Prisões de Vidro (Documentary) - 1958
 O Tarzan do 5º Esquerdo - 1958
 Sangue Toureiro - 1958
 Paisagem Atlântica (Documentary) - 1947
 Fado do Emigrante (Documentary) - 1940

References

Portuguese film directors
1910 births
2000 deaths
People from Lisbon